Mullazai may refer to:
 Mullazai, Khyber Pakhtunkhwa, a village in Pakistan.
 Mullazai tribe, a Baloch tribe in Balochistan, Pakistan.
 Mulazai tribe, a sub-tribe of the Kakar tribe.

See also
 Mollazehi, a Baloch tribe in Hiduj and Sarbaz County, Iran.
 Mallazai, a village in the Quetta District of Balochistan.